Ernest Palmer is the name of:

 Ernest Palmer (American cinematographer) (1885–1978), Hollywood cinematographer
 Ernest Palmer (British cinematographer) (1901–1964), British cinematographer
 Ernest Palmer, 1st Baron Palmer (1858–1948), British businessman and patron of music
 Ernest "Chili" Palmer, the lead character in the novel Get Shorty, and subsequent works